CGP Grey is an Irish-American educational YouTuber, podcaster, and live streamer based in the United Kingdom who creates explanatory videos on subjects including politics, geography, economics, sociology, history, and culture. In addition to video production, Grey is known for creating and hosting the podcasts Hello Internet with Brady Haran and Cortex with Myke Hurley.

Early life 

Grey grew up in the Long Island suburbs of New York City. He went to college in upstate New York, earning two degrees: one in physics and another in sociology. When Grey was a child, his father applied for Irish citizenship on his behalf, and he gained dual American–Irish citizenship.

Grey's Irish citizenship allowed him to move to the United Kingdom. Grey attended a masters program in economics in London, and he continues to live in the city. Grey became a physics teacher while in London.

Videos 
Grey's primary YouTube channel, CGP Grey, predominantly features explanatory videos on subjects including politics, geography, economics, history, productivity, the Internet, science, American culture, and British culture. The videos intend to debunk common misconceptions or answer everyday questions people may hold.

The videos feature Grey narrating over animations, stock footage, and still photographs. While nearly all of Grey's videos feature his voice, his face has never been shown in his videos, and Grey almost always has his face obscured when appearing in other people's videos; he generally uses a stick figure with glasses to represent himself. Grey has stated that the presentation style of his videos is influenced by that of Yahtzee Croshaw's Zero Punctuation series.

Grey's video that debunks popular misconceptions has been featured on CBS, as has his video about the history of the British royal family. Two videos differentiate London and the City of London, while explaining the history and government of the latter. Another two videos explaining copyright law and the Electoral College have been featured on Mashable. The channel also explains the economic disadvantages of US one-cent coins in a video titled Death to Pennies. Other videos, including How to Become Pope, have received media attention and have been used in instructional settings. Grey's video on the American debt limit received praise from economists.

Grey's video Humans Need Not Apply was covered by Business Insider and Huffington Post, and his animated video of Nick Bostrom's "The Fable of the Dragon-Tyrant" was "unanimously praise[d]" by the Life Extension Advocacy Foundation. In collaboration with fellow YouTuber Kurzgesagt, Grey produced a video entitled "You Are Two" which discusses the right brain versus the left brain. Popular Mechanics featured videos by Grey about airplane boarding and traffic congestion.

Podcasts

Hello Internet 

In January 2014, Grey launched the podcast Hello Internet along with co-host Brady Haran, another educational YouTuber and online content creator. The podcast peaked as the No. 1 iTunes podcast in United Kingdom, United States, Germany, Canada, and Australia in February 2014. The Guardian included the podcast among its 50 best of 2016, naming episode 66 ("A Classic Episode") its episode of the year. The paper described the podcast as having "in-depth debates and banter that is actually amusing." Grey reported a podcast listenership of approximately "a quarter million" downloads per episode as of September 2015.

The podcast features discussions pertaining to their lives as professional content creators for YouTube, as well as their interests and annoyances. Typical topics include technology etiquette; movie and TV show reviews; plane accidents; vexillology; futurology; and the differences between Grey's and Haran's personalities and lifestyles. Grey's and Haran's opinions and comments on feedback usually starts the next episode of the podcast. As a result of their conversations, Haran has been noted for reappropriating the term "", among other words, to refer to the unauthorized re-hosting of online media.

Cortex 
On 3 June 2015, Grey launched his second podcast, Cortex, with co-host Myke Hurley of Relay FM.

Reception 
Grey is regarded as a "celebrity in the niche world of educational YouTube videos," according to Caitlin Dewey. According to economist Joshua Gans, "while they may not be names in the halls of academia," YouTubers like Grey "have brought diverse explanations of mathematics, physics, political institutions, and history to millions on the Internet."

Robert Krulwich of NPR writes that Grey has "a curious talent for truth telling; he can take a charming lie and, with even more charm, rip it apart. It is very, very hard, as any teacher will tell you, to unlearn something that makes you comfortable and makes you feel smart, but Mr. Grey has the knack."

See also 
 Veritasium
 Tom Scott (presenter)

References

External links 
 
 

American editors
American expatriates in England
American people of Irish descent
American podcasters
American transhumanists
American YouTubers
Artists from New York (state)
British transhumanists
Citizens of Ireland through descent
DFTBA Records creators
Education-related YouTube channels
Educational and science YouTubers
English-language YouTube channels
Irish editors
Irish expatriates in England
Irish podcasters
Irish transhumanists
Life extensionists
Living people
Online edutainment
Patreon creators
People from Long Island
Physics educators
Schoolteachers from London
Year of birth missing (living people)
YouTube channels launched in 2010
YouTube podcasters